Feedbooks is a digital library and cloud publishing service for both public domain and original books founded in June 2007 and based in Paris, France. The main focus of the web site is providing e-books with particularly high-quality typesetting in multiple formats, particularly EPUB, Kindle, and PDF formats.

Features

Custom PDF generation settings, like trim size dimensions and margins, are possible on the site. Feedbooks offers over 80,000 ebooks. As of 2011, Feedbooks distributed around 3 million ebooks every month.

Books can be discovered and accessed by any client using the OPDS standard.

Self-published books are edited using a web interface;  they are also accessible via dedicated Kindle and mobile websites. The interface also supports creating footnotes.

See also
Internet Archive
Project Gutenberg

References

Further reading

External links

2007 establishments in France
Internet properties established in 2007
French digital libraries
Ebook suppliers
Online companies of France